The 1963 Syracuse Orangemen football team represented Syracuse University in the 1963 NCAA University Division football season.  The offense scored 255 points while the defense allowed 101 points. Led by head coach Ben Schwartzwalder, the team won eight games. Despite their 8–2 record, they were not invited to a bowl game. Syracuse played in their eighth and final game at Yankee Stadium, on Thanksgiving Day, with the Orangemen defeating Notre Dame, 14–7. This was a rematch following the teams' controversial 1961 game won by Notre Dame, 17–15.

Schedule

1964 NFL Draft

References

Syracuse
Syracuse Orange football seasons
Syracuse Orangemen football